Ewerby Thorpe is a hamlet in the civil parish of Ewerby and Evedon, in the North Kesteven district of Lincolnshire, England. The village of Ewerby lies just to the west, and Howell just to the south, with the River Slea running  to the north.

The hamlet is the site of the ancient village of Austhorpe. In the Domesday account Austhorpe is written as "Oustorp". In 1086 lordship of the manor transferred to Kolsveinn of Lincoln.

The land immediately to the north-west, south of the River Slea and stretching to South Kyme, was known as Ewerby Thorpe Fen. In the 13th century it was the part of the manorial lands of William de la Laund. He gave Ewerby Thorpe Fen, then called le Mykeldyke, to Haverholme Priory.

References

External links

Hamlets in Lincolnshire
North Kesteven District